Sudharshan is a 1951 Indian Tamil-language film directed by A. S. A. Sami and Sundar Rao Nadkarni. The film stars P. U. Chinnappa and P. Kannamba. The story is based on a popular folk myth about a Panduranga devotee Gora who was a potter by trade. The same story was filmed simultaneously by Gemini Studios. The Gemini version Chakra Dhari was released early and due to unknown reason Sudharshan was delayed.

Plot
Refer to this for details.

Cast
Cast according to the opening credits of the film

Male Cast
 P. U. Chinnappa as Gorakumbhar
 T. S. Balaiah as Namadhevar
 D. Balasubramaniam as Sevaji
 P. B. Rangachari as Pandurangan
 Radhakrishnan as Venkaji
 K. Sayeeram as Penda
 C. P. Kittan as Goldsmith

Female Cast
P. Kannamba as Thulasi Bai
Lalitha as Rukmani
(Yoga) Mangalam as Shantha Bai
C. K. Saraswathi as Sona

Production
S. S. Vasan of Gemini Studios and Jupiter Pictures started producing the same story under different titles almost simultaneously. However, Gemini's version titled Chakradhari was released in 1948 and was successful at the box-office. Sudharsan was delayed for reasons unknown and was released almost 3 years later in 1951.
Popular Carnatic musician and playback singer M. L. Vasanthakumari was cast initially to do the character of the second wife of Gora (PUC). She left the film for undisclosed reasons after a few reels were shot. She was replaced by Mangalam of the famous Yogam-Mangalam dance duo. Likewise, A. S. A. Sami who was directing the film, was replaced by Sundar Rao Nadkarni.
P. U. Chinnappa who played the male lead role, died at a young age, before the film was released.

Soundtrack
Music was composed by G. Ramanathan and the lyrics were penned by Papanasam Sivan and K. D. Santhanam. Singers are P. U. Chinnappa, P. B. Rangachari & P. Kannamba. Playback singers are P. A. Periyanayaki & T. R. Gajalakshmi.

The singing star, P. U. Chinnappa sang many songs one of which, Anna sedan papa… was a hit.

References

1951 films
1950s Tamil-language films
Hindu devotional films
Films scored by G. Ramanathan